Lydia Beebe Hastings Stevens (August 2, 1918 – February 25, 2014) was an American politician.

Born in Highland Park, Illinois, she graduated from Vassar College in 1939. In 1940, she married George Cooke Stevens and eventually moved to Greenwich, Connecticut. She was involved in the community and was President of the Greenwich Broadcasting Company. She served in the Connecticut House of Representatives in 1988 and 1990 as a Republican. Stevens died in Guilford, Connecticut.

Notes

1918 births
2014 deaths
People from Greenwich, Connecticut
People from Highland Park, Illinois
Vassar College alumni
Businesspeople from Connecticut
Women state legislators in Connecticut
Republican Party members of the Connecticut House of Representatives
20th-century American businesspeople
20th-century American women
21st-century American women